Nostalgia In Stereo is the second album released by Coheed and Cambria guitarist Travis Stever, under the name of Davenport Cabinet.

Track listing
   "Square One"
   "Nostalgia In Stereo"
   "Thieves"
   "Milk Foot"
   "Wrecking Ball"
   "Rusty Knives"
   "Angel On The Shoulder"
   "Pissing In The Wind"
   "12 Hours"
   "Tired Of Driving"
   "Demon Fire"

2008 albums
Davenport Cabinet albums
Equal Vision Records albums